

Jing can refer to:

 Jing (software), formerly Jing Project
 Jing (surname), a Chinese surname
 Jing River, in China
 Jing (instrument), a large gong used in Korean traditional music

Concepts
 Chinese classics (jīng)
 Jing (Chinese medicine), a principle in Traditional Chinese medicine and Chinese martial arts, sometimes confused with jìn (勁; power)
 Jing (Chinese opera), a major male role type in Chinese opera
 Jing (philosophy), a concept in Chinese philosophy which means "respect"

Places 
 Jing County, Anhui, in China
 Jing County, Hebei, in China
 Jinghe County , also known as Jing County, in Xinjiang, China
 Chu (state), also known as Jing, in ancient China

Fiction 
 King of Bandit Jing, also known as Jing: King of Bandits, a seven volume manga series by Yuichi Kumakura, and the related anime
 Jing King, a character in the Sly Cooper video game series

Others 
 Jing people, an indigenous Vietnamese-speaking ethnic minority of China (also Kinh)